The Carey Farm Site (7K-D-3) is a prehistoric Native American archaeological site in central Kent County, Delaware, near Dover.  The site, located along the St. Jones River, encompasses what is believed to be a major seasonal base camp from the Woodland Period. Ceramics dating to 200 CE have been found at the site.

The site was listed on the National Register of Historic Places in 1977.

See also
National Register of Historic Places listings in Kent County, Delaware

References

Archaeological sites on the National Register of Historic Places in Delaware
Buildings and structures in Dover, Delaware
National Register of Historic Places in Kent County, Delaware
Archaeological sites in Delaware